Herberton Uniting Church is a heritage-listed church at 2-4 Lillian Street, Herberton, Tablelands Region, Queensland, Australia. It was built in 1891 by R Petersens. It is also known as Herberton Presbyterian Church. It was added to the Queensland Heritage Register on 27 August 1999. The building was burnt down in a fire on 25 November 2022. Police have said they are looking into the cause.

History 
The Herberton Uniting Church was constructed in 1891 as the Herberton Presbyterian Church. In 1977 following the creation of the Uniting Church in Australia, the Herberton church became known as the Herberton Uniting Church.

Both the Methodist and Presbyterian Churches on the Tablelands were formed from Herberton. With the discovery of tin in Herberton, a community flourished and religious groups commenced regular meetings. The late 1880s and early 1890s were a boom time for Herberton with the establishment of the Great Northern Mining Company. From Herberton both the Methodist and Presbyterian churches expanded across the Tablelands, with the Presbyterian church being designated a sanction charge in 1891.

On 29 November 1890, Messrs John Newell, W Bona, J Blain, Gordon and Meldrum met in the lounge of a local hotel to discuss the feasibility of forming a Presbyterian Church in Herberton. Rev. Ewan's parish extended to Irvinebank, Montalbion, Orient Camp, Muldiva, Calcifer, Newelltown, Carrington and Martintown (Tolga).

On 18 March 1891 a meeting of parish members and the local council was convened in the Herbertson Shire Clerk's office where a site in Lillian Street was selected for the construction of a church building. The site was levelled by voluntary labour.

The foundation stone of the church was laid on 4 July 1891 by the Lady Mayoress of the Herberton Shire, Mrs Bonar. The church was dedicated and Rev. Ewan was inducted at a ceremony on 15 November 1891. When opened the church was fitted with red cedar pews, a red cedar pulpit, and the organ purchased for the church and used previously for services held in the School of Arts hall.

In 1911 when the Tablelands railway from Atherton to Ravenshoe was laid, a portion of the property was resumed for this use, changing quite dramatically the setting of the church. Following earthworks for the construction of the siding, the northern rear corner of the church subsided and the entire structure was moved about  southward.

A Roll of Honour made from copper was erected following World War I. This lists the names of the fallen and those who served in the war. During World War II many serviceman were stationed in this area of north Queensland and many reputedly attended regular services at the Herberton Presbyterian Church. Certainly the visitors book of the church lists the names of about 400 service men who attended services during this period.

In 1959 communion furniture was purchased for the church by the parishioners. A communion table, moderator's chair and two elders' chairs were donated to the church by local families.

Following the amalgamation of the Congregational, Methodist and Presbyterian Churches in Australia into the Uniting Church in Australia in June 1977, the Herberton Presbyterian Church became the Herberton Uniting Church.

On Friday 25 November 2022, the church was destroyed in a fire.

Description 
The Herberton Uniting Church is a simple rectangular planned timber church building with a gabled roof sited adjacent to the Atherton-Herberton rail line which lines the southern bank of the Wild River through Herberton. The church faces Lillian Street.

The church is of single skin timber construction with external framing and bracing creating an interesting external surface. The building has a steeply pitched gabled roof which is clad with sheets of corrugated iron. A simple timber finial is fixed to the apex of the roof on the front face of the building. The church is slightly elevated on concrete stumps.

The principal facade of the building, which addresses Lillian Street is symmetrically composed with a central projecting porch flanked by lancet windows. The timber framed porch has a gabled awning which reflects the pitch of the main roof of the structure. The awning is supported on stop chamfered timber posts. Sections of timber balustrade extend from the timber posts to the front face of the church. The entrance door is a double timber boarded door in a pointed arched timber doorframe. The awning covers a small concrete pad which provides a level threshold for entrance to the building. Centrally positioned above the entrance porch is a three-part lancet window arrangement.

The two sides of the church are lined with four lancet window openings, reflecting the internal bays. The rear of the church has a small timber door near the eastern corner and is otherwise plain.

The interior of the church is a simple single room with high ceiling constructed within the roof space, exposing simple timber trusses. The internal walls are lined with horizontal timber boarding. A timber screen of vertical boarding is fixed adjacent to the entrance door creating an entrance vestibule.

Internally the building contains many early significant elements which contribute to the documentation of the place's history. Such elements include a red cedar pulpit fixed to the rear wall of the church and comprising a moulded and panelled reredos surmounted by decorative carved timber panels and into which is incorporated a stool, in front of this is a three sided enclosure of timber moulded panels which is reached via three timber steps. The pulpit features several carved timber finials in the shape of acorns. Other significant items include marble tablets, one commemorating parishioners who fought in World War I, another to the remembrance of Rev. JD Marly; and an unusual Roll of Honour made from beaten copper also commemorating those who fought during World War I.

The red cedar pews within the church date from the original building and are simple seats with railed backs and carved pew ends. The organ which dates from the earliest services held by the Uniting Church in the Herberton School of Arts is also an unusual and significant feature. The communion furniture includes a table, moderator's chairs and two elder's chairs all of which are of timber.

Heritage listing 
Herberton Uniting Church was listed on the Queensland Heritage Register on 27 August 1999 having satisfied the following criteria.

The place is important in demonstrating the evolution or pattern of Queensland's history.

The Herberton Uniting Church, constructed in 1891 as the Herberton Presbyterian Church demonstrates the development of the Presbyterian Church in Queensland. The development of the Presbyterian Church in the Tablelands area of north Queensland originated with the Herberton parish. The church also demonstrates the growth of Herberton as a mining town during the 1880s and 1890s following the discovery of tin and other metals.

The place is important in demonstrating the principal characteristics of a particular class of cultural places.

The building is a good example of a simple timber ecclesiastical building peculiar to Queensland with its single skinned construction and external frame.

The place is important because of its aesthetic significance.

The building is a good example of a simple timber ecclesiastical building peculiar to Queensland with its single skinned construction and external frame.

The place has a strong or special association with a particular community or cultural group for social, cultural or spiritual reasons.

The Herberton Uniting Church has social value as a place of public worship for about 108 years. The early Presbyterian community funded the acquisition of land and the erection of the original building and, since then, parishioners have donated various fittings and fixtures which create strong ties to the community. The social value of the place is further emphasised by the two Rolls of Honour within the building commemorating World War I.

References

Attribution

External links 

Queensland Heritage Register
Herberton, Queensland
Uniting churches in Queensland
Articles incorporating text from the Queensland Heritage Register
Queensland in World War II
Presbyterian churches in Queensland